Andre Cavaro Lucas  (October 2, 1930 – July 23, 1970) was killed in action while serving as the commanding officer, 2nd Battalion, 506th Infantry, 101st Airborne Division, United States Army, at Fire Support Base Ripcord in Thua Thien Province, South Vietnam. He received the Medal of Honor posthumously for extraordinary heroism during the last 23 days of his life.

Early life and education
Lucas was born in Washington D.C. His father William was a career Army officer who had fought in France during World War I. His mother Suzanne had been born in France and she sent him to her home town there to receive his secondary education. Lucas enlisted in the Army on June 30, 1948 and was assigned to the same company in the 26th Infantry Regiment that his father had commanded during the World War I. He received an at-large presidential appointment to the United States Military Academy, graduating with a B.S. degree in 1954. After receiving his Army commission, he attended the Infantry, Ranger and Airborne Schools. Lucas later graduated from the Army Command and General Staff College at Fort Leavenworth in 1965 and L'École d'état-major (the French Staff Academy) in Paris in 1966.

Medal of Honor citation
Rank and organization: Lieutenant Colonel, U.S. Army, 2d Battalion, 506th Infantry, 101st Airborne Division. place and date: Fire Support Base Ripcord, Republic of Vietnam, 1 to July 23, 1970. Entered service at: West Point, N.Y. Born: October 2, 1930, Washington D.C.

Citation:

In memory
 LTC Lucas' name can be found on the Vietnam Veterans Memorial ("The Wall") on Panel 08W – Row 046.
 The Andre Lucas Elementary School in Ft. Campbell, Kentucky is named in honor of LTC Lucas.

 A tribute to Lucas by his West Point classmate William E. Odom was published in TAPS, May/June 2005. Odom also dedicated his 1992 book On Internal War to Lucas.

Personal
Lucas was the son of William Edward Lucas Jr. and Suzanne Provost. His father received a B.S. degree in mechanical engineering from the Massachusetts Institute of Technology in 1914. He was commissioned in 1916 and received three Silver Stars and two Purple Hearts for his World War I combat service. His parents were buried at Arlington National Cemetery.

Lucas married Madeleine Mae Miller, who was also fluent in French because of Swiss-French parentage. They had two sons. Lucas and his wife were interred at the West Point Cemetery.

See also

List of Medal of Honor recipients
List of Medal of Honor recipients for the Vietnam War
FSB Ripcord

Notes

References
 "Ripcord: Screaming Eagles Under Siege, Vietnam 1970" by Keith W. Nolan, Presidio Press, 2000, 
 "Hell On A Hill Top: America's Last Major Battle In Vietnam" by Major General Benjamin L. Harrison, iUniverse Press (available from FSB Ripcord Association)

 "Siege at Firebase Ripcord", War Stories with Oliver North, Fox News Productions, product # FOX25004600 (video/DVD)

External links

1930 births
1970 deaths
People from Washington, D.C.
United States Military Academy alumni
United States Army Rangers
United States Army Command and General Staff College alumni
United States Army personnel of the Vietnam War
Recipients of the Silver Star
United States Army colonels
Vietnam War recipients of the Medal of Honor
United States Army Medal of Honor recipients
American military personnel killed in the Vietnam War
Burials at West Point Cemetery